is a Japanese rugby manga series written by Shunsaku Yano and illustrated by Chizuka Erisawa, with original character designs by Rihito Takarai. It was serialized in Media Factory's shōjo manga magazine Monthly Comic Gene from June 15, 2018, to August 16, 2019, and was collected in three tankōbon volumes. An anime television series adaptation by Gonzo aired from July 30 to October 15, 2019.

Characters

Media

Manga

Anime
An anime television series adaptation was announced in the April issue of Monthly Comic Gene on March 15, 2019. The series is animated by Gonzo and directed by Tadayoshi Sasaki, with Makoto Takada handled series composition, Kan Soramoto designed the characters, and R・O・N composed the music. It aired from July 30 to October 15, 2019, on NTV and other channels. The opening theme is  performed by Shōgo Sakamoto, while the ending theme is  performed by Ivy to Fraudulent Game. Crunchyroll streamed the series. On February 20, 2020 Sentai Filmworks announced that they licensed the series.

Notes

References

External links
 

2019 anime television series debuts
Anime series based on manga
Gonzo (company)
Kadokawa Dwango franchises
Media Factory manga
Nippon TV original programming
Rugby in anime and manga
Shōjo manga